Maurice Bayrou (2 March 1905 in Lanta, Haute-Garonne – 29 December 1996) was a French veterinarian and politician.

Bayrou was a member of the National Assembly from 1946 to 1958, representing the Gabon-Moyen-Congo constituency. During his tenure as a deputy, Bayrou was successively affiliated with the Democratic and Socialist Union of the Resistance, the Rally of the French People, and the National Centre of Social Republicans. He served on the Senate between 1959 and 1977. As a senator, he held the Seine seat until the department's dissolution, and represented Paris afterwards.  In the Senate, Bayrou was affiliated with the Union of Democrats for the Republic and the Rally for the Republic.

References

1905 births
1996 deaths
People from Haute-Garonne
Politicians from Occitania (administrative region)
Democratic and Socialist Union of the Resistance politicians
Rally of the French People politicians
National Centre of Social Republicans politicians
Union for the New Republic politicians
Union of Democrats for the Republic politicians
Rally for the Republic politicians
Deputies of the 1st National Assembly of the French Fourth Republic
Deputies of the 2nd National Assembly of the French Fourth Republic
Deputies of the 3rd National Assembly of the French Fourth Republic
Deputies of the 1st National Assembly of the French Fifth Republic
French Senators of the Fifth Republic
Senators of Seine (department)
Senators of Paris
French veterinarians
Companions of the Liberation